Moonlight and Cactus can refer to:

 Moonlight and Cactus (1932 film), a 1932 American film
 Moonlight and Cactus (1944 film), a 1944 American film